Roger Kochman (born June 16, 1941) is a former American collegiate and Professional Football player. He was an All-American halfback at Penn State in 1962 and played one season with the American Football League (AFL)'s Buffalo Bills (1963) where he accumulated 232 yards in 47 rushing attempts and had 4 receptions for 148 yards and a touchdown.

See also
 Other American Football League players

1941 births
Living people
Players of American football from Pittsburgh
Buffalo Bills players
Penn State Nittany Lions football players
American football running backs
American Football League players